The 1992 Spanish Grand Prix was a Formula One motor race held on 3 May 1992 at the Circuit de Catalunya, Montmeló. The 65-lap race was the fourth round of the 1992 Formula One World Championship and was won by Nigel Mansell driving a Williams-Renault and scoring the third Grand Chelem of his career.

The race was also advertised as the Grand Prix of the Olympic Games. The race was moved up from its former September date, and held just months before the 1992 Summer Olympics in Barcelona.

Qualifying

Pre-qualifying report
The Friday morning pre-qualifying session was a similar story to the previous session in Brazil. The Andrea Moda cars were well behind the performance of the other entrants in the session, who all pre-qualified easily. Perry McCarthy had regained his Super Licence so was able to compete for the team alongside Roberto Moreno. Team boss Andrea Sassetti had been approached by Enrico Bertaggia, whom Sassetti had sacked after the Mexican Grand Prix, but who now wanted to return to the team with $1 million in sponsorship. Sassetti wanted to fire McCarthy and rehire Bertaggia, but was told that the team had already reached its maximum number of driver changes for the season, so was forced to retain McCarthy.

In the session itself, Bertrand Gachot was again fastest for Larrousse, less than a tenth of a second faster than Michele Alboreto in the Footwork. Third was Gachot's team-mate Ukyo Katayama, 1.4 seconds ahead of the last pre-qualifier, Andrea Chiesa in the Fondmetal.

McCarthy took to the track for Andrea Moda, but his engine cut out just four metres after the pitlane exit line. Moreno managed three laps in his car before it also suffered an engine failure. McCarthy's car was brought back for Moreno to use, but the Brazilian was still unable to pre-qualify.

Pre-qualifying classification

Qualifying report
Damon Hill, son of former world champion Graham Hill, made his debut with Brabham, replacing Giovanna Amati who was dismissed from the team, but did not qualify for the race. As in the three previous races, Mansell qualified in pole position, ahead of Michael Schumacher, Ayrton Senna, Riccardo Patrese, Ivan Capelli and Martin Brundle.

Qualifying classification

Race

Race report
At the start of the race, in damp conditions, Patrese got by Schumacher and Senna. Ferrari driver Jean Alesi made a good start from 8th on the grid to third into the first corner on the first lap, forcing other drivers to take defensive actions and drop back. Senna dropped from third all the way to seventh. But, he recovered two positions to fifth during the first lap. The order was: Mansell, Patrese, Alesi, Schumacher, Senna and Capelli.

Andrea de Cesaris became the first retirement in the Tyrrell with an engine problem on lap 3 where he retired in the pits. Brundle meanwhile had spun off on the main straight into retirement with a clutch problem by lap 5. Schumacher attacked and passed Alesi on lap 7. Berger tried to do the same but tipped Alesi into a spin, putting the Frenchman behind Senna and Capelli as well. By, now the rain intensified, and Patrese spun off on lap 20 while trying to lap a backmarker. This put Mansell ahead of Schumacher, Senna, Berger, Capelli and Alesi. Maurício Gugelmin had spun into the pit wall on lap 25 meaning more disaster for the Jordan team, as he was the only one to qualify for the race.

Alesi pitted for fresh tyres halfway through the race, and soon began to charge up through the field as the rain intensified despite making contact with both Gerhard Berger in the McLaren and Mika Häkkinen in the Lotus forcing the Finn to spin off the track whilst trying to lap him, who eventually retired after 56 laps from spinning off. He cruised past Berger for fourth and began to close in quickly on Senna and Schumacher. With two laps to go Senna spun off and into the wall trying to lap Martini, although he was still classified 9th; he had already spun and recovered a few laps earlier. At the same time, Capelli spun off as well (The Italian was classified 10th).

Mansell continued his perfect record in 1992 with his fourth win of the season from Schumacher, Alesi, Berger, Alboreto and Pierluigi Martini, but for the first time in the season his Williams team did not score a 1-2 finish. Martin Brundle scored his fourth consecutive retirement of the season in his Benetton, it was proven to be a clutch failure by lap 2 causing the Benetton to eventually spin into retirement on lap 5.

Race classification

Championship standings after the race

Drivers' Championship standings

Constructors' Championship standings

 Note: Only the top five positions are included for both sets of standings.

References

Spanish Grand Prix
Spanish Grand Prix
Grand Prix